DR5 may refer to:

 DR5 (car), an Italian Mini SUV by DR Motor Company, based on the  Chinese SUV Chery Tiggo
 TNFRSF10B, a human gene
 dr5 chrome, a reversal black-and-white process
 DR-5, a highway in the Dominican Republic
 DR5 register, a debug register in x86 processors